Chapleau Cree Fox Lake ("shaplo kri makishiw sakahikan") is a First Nations reserve close to Chapleau, Ontario, Canada. It is one of the reserves of the Chapleau Cree First Nation.

Chiefs 
 Keith Corston (present) 
 Michael Cahagee

References

External links
 Canada Lands Survey System

Cree reserves in Ontario
Communities in Sudbury District